= Forbing Park, Arizona =

Populated place in Yavapai County, Arizona

- Populated place
- Location within the state of Arizona Forbing Park (the United States)
- Coordinates: 34°33′56″N 112°29′45″W
- Country: United States
- State: Arizona
- County: Yavapai
- Elevation: 5,485 ft (1,672 m)
- Time zone: UTC-7 (Mountain (MST))
- Area code: 928
- FIPS code: 04-23970
- GNIS feature ID: 29097

Forbing Park is a populated place situated in Yavapai County, Arizona, United States.
